Frederick Henry Parslow  (14 August 1932 – 26 January 2017) was an Australian actor, who appeared in film, television and theatre.

Acting career

Parslow was notable in several film and TV roles, with parts in internationally successful TV soap opera's The Sullivans and Neighbours and was active in theatre, having served as a member of the Melbourne Theatre Company for nearly thirty years, joining the company when it was founded in 1953, known then the Union Theatre Repertory Company, and making his first performance with in a touring production of Twelfth Night

Whilst a dominant figure on the Melbourne theatre scene, Parslow was generally reluctant to take on television roles. He made television appearances in the 1960s, in comedy and variety sketches with theatre colleagues on The Ray Taylor Show and In Melbourne Tonight. Minor roles included Crawford Productions staples Bluey, Skyways, and Cop Shop.
 
Parslow's also featured in several TV miniseries and TV films with roles in Against the Wind and The Humpty Dumpty Man

Parslow's cameo film roles included Alvin Purple (1973) as Alvin's father, and Peter Weir's 1977 film The Last Wave as Reverend Burton.

Honours and personal life

Parslow was made a Member of the Order of Australia in 1987, for service to the performing arts.
 
In 1961, Parslow married actress Joan Harris, who also acted at the Melbourne Theatre Company, she predeceased  him by five months in September 2016

Filmography
As You Are (TV movie, 1958)
The Adventures of the Terrible Ten (TV series, 1960)
Martine (TV movie, 1961) 
The Rivals (TV movie, 1961)
Boy Round the Corner (TV movie, 1962)
Suspect (TV movie, 1962)
She'll Be Right (TV movie, 1962)
Manhaul (TV movie, 1962)
Double Yolk (TV movie, 1963)
The Magic Boomerang (TV series, 1965)
Adventure Unlimited (TV series, 1965)
Australian Playhouse (TV series, 1966)
Salome (TV movie, 1968)
Alvin Purple (1973)
Bluey (TV series, 1977)
The Last Wave (1977)
The Importance of Keeping Perfectly Still (1977)
The Sullivans (1976-1977, 756 episodes)
Against the Wind (TV miniseries, 1978)
Cop Shop (TV series, 1979)
Burn the Butterflies (TV movie, 1979)
Skyways (TV series, 1979)
Pesticides In the Field (1983)
A Long Way from Home (TV movie, 1988)
Outback (1989)
The Humpty Dumpty Man (1989)
Space Knights (TV series, 1989)
Neighbours (TV series, 1990)
The Paper Man (TV miniseries, 1990)
Col'n Carpenter (TV series, 1991)
Mission Top Secret (TV series, 1993–1995)
Search for Treasure Island (TV series, 1998–2000)

References

External links

1932 births
2017 deaths
Australian male stage actors
Australian male television actors
Members of the Order of Australia
Male actors from Melbourne